Kimcheed Radish Cubes is a South Korean television series. It aired on MBC from August 18, 2007 to January 27, 2008 on Saturdays and Sundays at 19:55 for 44 episodes.

The title is a reference to the kimchi side dish kkakdugi.

Synopsis
Even though times change and our relationships with our family changes, our affection for them is timeless. The drama is about affection that is the foundation of family. Dong-jin is the eldest son in a family of 3 sons. He is dutiful and responsible but due to character clash, he has gone through divorce with his ex-wife, Ji-hye, whom he shares a child with. Dong-jin then starts a new romance with Eun-ho whom he works with. Jang Sa-ya is a girl that has grown up living in a secluded temple in the countryside. She meets and helps Park Jae-woo when he passes out in a forest nearby. He hangs her a card saying he would repay her if she ever goes to Seoul. As Sa-ya continues develops a curiosity of the world and wants to escape her "monk" life, her constant effort finally reaches an agreement with her guardian at the monastery. Her guardian tells her she has a father in Seoul, thus starting her venture to find her father. Along the way she meets some unfortunate events, and while searching for her father, Jae-woo soon falls for her.

Cast
Jung family
Kim Sung-kyum as Jung Gu-man
Na Moon-hee as Na Dal-rae
Kim Se-yoon as Jung Han-mo
Go Doo-shim as Baek Geum-hee
Kim Seung-soo as Jung Dong-jin
Kim Heung-soo as Jung Dong-shik
Seo Jun-young as Jung Dong-min
Bang Joon-seo as Jung Ha-som

Lee family
Seo In-seok as Lee Seung-yong
Kim Ja-ok as Choi Ji-sook
Yoo Ho-jeong as Yoo Eun-ho
Kim Jung-hak as Lee Min-ki
Park Jung-sook as Park Jae-young
Lee Min-jung as Lee Min-do

Park family
Choi Ran as Song Soo-nam
Joo Sang-wook as Park Jae-woo

Extended cast
Park Shin-hye as Jang Sa-ya
Kim Bo-kyung as Seo Ji-hye
Kil Yong-woo as Hwang Sang-beom
Ahn Sun-young as Team Leader Yang

References

External links
Kimcheed Radish Cubes official MBC website 
Cubed Radish Kimchi at KoreanWiz
Just Love at MBC Global Media

MBC TV television dramas
2007 South Korean television series debuts
2008 South Korean television series endings
Korean-language television shows
South Korean romance television series